Session is a cross-platform end-to-end encrypted instant messaging application. It is developed by The Oxen Project under the non-profit Oxen Privacy Tech Foundation. It uses a decentralized network for transmission. Users can send one-to-one and group messages, which can include files, voice notes, images and videos.

Features 
Session does not require a telephone number or email address to create an account. It uses a randomly generated 66-digit alpha-numeric number for user creation/identification. Communication (messages, voice clips, photos, and files) between users is end-to-end encrypted using the Session protocol, a derivative of the Signal protocol. A Tor-like decentralized server network, called Oxen Service Nodes, is used by Session for transmissions. The Oxen Project intends for this network to not store, track, or log the metadata of user messages.

There was an independent review by the third party Quarkslab in 2021 that verified these claims.

Limitations 
Session does not support two-factor authentication. Underlying protocols are still in a developmental phase.

References

External links 
 

Cross-platform software
Cryptographic software
Free and open-source Android software
Free instant messaging clients
Free security software
Free software programmed in Java (programming language)
Instant messaging clients programmed in Java
Internet privacy software
IOS software
Linux software
MacOS software
Windows software
Secure communication